Demetrius II was an Indo-Greek king who ruled briefly during the 2nd century BC. Little is known about him and there are different views about how to date him. Earlier authors such as Tarn and Narain saw him as a son and sub-king of Demetrius I, but this view has now been abandoned.

Osmund Bopearachchi has suggested that he ruled in Bactria and Arachosia c. 175–170 BC, but this has been challenged by later authors. R. C. Senior instead prefers c. 175–140 BC, and this is supported by L M Wilson who also assumes from numismatical clues and portrait likeness that Demetrius II was a relative of Eucratides the Great. The later dating is supported by the circumstance that no coins of Demetrius II have been found in the ruins of Ai Khanoum, which was presumably destroyed during the reign of Eucratides I.

Coinage 
Demetrius II issued only silver and mostly tetradrachms, another trait which he has in common with the last Bactrian kings. The obverse shows a diademed portrait, with a standing Pallas Athene holding a spear on the reverse. Unlike most of his contemporaries, he has no epithet. Demetrius II is depicted as a young man, though his features differ considerably among the different issues. Several coins are struck off-center and crudely; this suggests that Demetrius II used a number of temporary mints.

Identification
Roman historian Justin names a "Demetrius, king of the Indians," who was an enemy of Eucratides the Great (reigned 172/171–145 BC). Justin's Demetrius beleaguered the warlike Eucratides with an army of 60,000 men against the latter's garrison of 300, but still — according to the probably exaggerated account — eventually was defeated. This episode is referred to as occurring at the end of the reign of Eucratides, hence dating the death of Justin's Demetrius around 150 BC. 

However, the king mentioned by Justin is not easily reconciled with the numismatic evidence, and views are divided as for how to interpret the various coinage series bearing the name Demetrius. Bopearachchi has identified three kings named Demetrius. Demetrius I reigned in Bactria and India c. 200-185 BC, well before the rise of Eucratides, and Demetrius III was an Indian king who is thought to have ruled much later, around 100 BC. There remains Demetrius II, who Bopearachchi suggested reigned around 170 BC.

Bopearachchi identified Demetrius II with Justin’s Demetrius of India, notwithstanding the fact that Justin's quote suggests a later reign. Furthermore, Bopearachchi’s Demetrius II reigned in Bactria and not in India, as he struck no coins with Indian legends. Therefore, the identity of Justin's Demetrius, king of the Indians, remains uncertain. The following hypotheses may be considered:

 The account of Justin, who is a second-hand source, is confused. Either Demetrius II was not king of India but Bactria, or the account of the war is mixed up, or the king's name is wrong, Justin having confused the name of another Indo-Greek king with that of Demetrius I.
 Bopearachchi's Demetrius III could be placed earlier - this king's coins are few and rather peculiar - and Demetrius III was in fact Justin's Demetrius who ruled half a century earlier.

Even if Justin's Demetrius, king of the Indians existed, this does not foreclose the possibility that Eucratides also had a son named Demetrius, which was a common dynastic name at the time. The prince may have been named after the Seleucid Demetrius I Soter.

See also
 Indo-Greek Kingdom
 Seleucid Empire
 Greco-Buddhism
 Indo-Scythians
 Indo-Parthian Kingdom
 Kushan Empire

External links
Catalog of the coins of Demetrios II
Le Roi Démétrios II

Notes

References
 The Greeks in Bactria and India, W.W. Tarn, Cambridge University Press.

170 BC deaths
Indo-Greek kings
2nd-century BC Indian monarchs
Year of birth unknown
Euthydemid dynasty